LiseLotte Olsson (born 1954) is a Swedish Left Party politician. She has been a member of the Riksdag since 2006.

External links
LiseLotte Olsson at the Riksdag website

Members of the Riksdag from the Left Party (Sweden)
Living people
1954 births
Women members of the Riksdag
21st-century Swedish women politicians
Date of birth missing (living people)